Trystavisim (ukr. Триставісім) - is a Ukrainian rock band from Uzhgorod, Zakarpattia, Ukraine.

Description 
The music played by a rock band is built on the basis of elements of folk-rock, punk, ska and is decorated with a colorful addition of forceful melodies. In general the style of the band can be described as folk punk.

History
The first performance of the group was held in November 23, 2010 in Lviv in Nabutky Etnoclub and Lviv Art association Dzyga.

Over the next two years, the band toured with performances in almost every major city in Western Ukraine, having played more than 50 concerts (including the performance in one of the largest Ukrainian festivals of music and art, which is festival "Zahid").

On March 26, 2013 the band presented their debut mini-album (EP) called "Percha", which included 5 songs.

On March 31, 2013 the band took part in a radio project Tysa FM Live, doing online tracks live from the debut album.

Later "Trystavisim" was invited to take part in the filming of television programs on the first national TV channel (Folk-music) and TVI (Music for Adult with Maria Burmaka).

On August 13, 2013 was presented a debut video clip for the song called "Dyslocatsiya" which received approving reviews from music critics.

During the summer of 2013 the band performed on the vast majority of festivals in Ukraine, they received an unofficial status of "a discovery of summer festivals 2013 in Ukrainian music".

In spring 2014 the band announced the release of their debut full-length album, and subsequently announced his name. The record was called "LATCHO". In support of the album as part of the announced tour "Latcho Tour 2014 / Round 1" band played many concerts in Ukraine and abroad, visiting the festivals Kraina Mriy in Kyiv, which was founded by known Ukrainian musician Oleh Skrypka, Lemkowska watra in Zdynia (Poland), and Zahid.

January 27, 2015 the album "LATCHO" was officially released. February 12, 2015, the group published the official music video for one of the main songs from the album, the song Varosh banda. Then, in support of the album, band played two great concerts in Uzhgorod and Kyiv, February 27 and March 13, respectively.

In May, the group published an original animated video for the song  Nasha faita and played many concerts in Ukraine and abroad during the festival season.

2016 announcement on the band's new EP and the release of two singles with videos. In March, a video  Rangers was released, and already on April 22 the band presented his new program "Varoshska Tusa" via big concert in Uzhgorod. Subsequently, on June 7, was published scandalous video  Varoshska Tusa, which has caused mixed reactions.

Currently band working on second album.

Members 
 Pavlo Genov - lead vocals
 Andriy Shapovalov - bass
 Igor Magada - drums
 Volodymyr Shchobak - trumpet, backing vocals
 Stanislav Mykultsya - accordion, backing vocals
 Arsen Babichenko - guitar,  backing vocals
 Mikhail Kurtyak - Dj Vibes
 Oleh Orieshnikov - sound director

Discography

Singles
 December 2012 — "Dyslokatsiya" (Дислокація)
 January 2015 — "Transcarpathia" (Транскарпатія)

Albums
 March 2013 — Percha (Перча) [EP]
 January 2015 — Latcho (Лачо)

Videography
 August, 2013 —  Dyslocatsiya
 February, 2015 —  Varosh banda
 May, 2015 —  Nasha faita 
 March, 2016 —  Rangers 
 June, 2016 —  Varoshska tusa

Festivals 
 Music Bike Ukraine
 Goral Music Avia Bike Ukraine — 2012
 Zaxidfest — 2012
 Rurysko — 2013
 Music Bike Ukraine — 2013
 Pidkamin' — 2013
 Faine misto — 2013
 Franko-mission — 2013
 Zaxidfest — 2013
 Cheremosh — 2014
 Kraina Mriy - 2014
 Faine misto — 2014
 Lemkowska watra, Zdynia - 2014
 Zaxidfest — 2014
 Wild wild fest — 2015
 Ole Dovbush — 2015
 Kraina Mriy — 2015
 Faine misto — 2016
 Woodstock Ukraine— 2016
 Zaxidfest — 2016
 Obnova — 2016
 Dnister-fest — 2016
 Wild wild fest — 2016

References

External links 
 trystavisim.com
 YouTube

Sources 
 varosh.com.ua
 rock.kiev.ua
 umka.com
 notatky.com.ua
 www.mukachevo.net
 zakarpattya.net.ua
 nashe.com.ua

Ukrainian rock music groups
Folk punk musicians
Ukrainian ska groups